Royalty is an unincorporated community in Ward County, Texas, United States. Before a post office was opened in 1929, it was known as Allentown, after an early landowner. In 1933 Royalty had an estimated population of twenty, and a hotel, drugstore, café, pool hall, barbershop, and laundry. Its population peaked at 750 in 1940. With declining oilfield activity, the population had fallen to about 190 by 1968. In 1990 the population was reported as 196. The population dropped to twenty-nine in 2000, and currently has a population under 50 people.

Education
The Grandfalls-Royalty Independent School District serves area students.

External links
 

Unincorporated communities in Ward County, Texas
Unincorporated communities in Texas